The Matador is an American chain of Mexican restaurants, based in Seattle, Washington.

Description and history 

The Matador is a Mexican restaurant chain based in Seattle. Owners Nate Opper and Zak Melang started the business in 2004. As of February 2016, there were locations in Seattle, Portland (Oregon), Boise and Meridian, Idaho, and Denver. The restaurant also operated in Redmond and Tacoma, as of 2020. According to Bradley Martin of Eater Las Vegas, "Each location features distinctive ironwork created by Melang himself, who also cuts and designs each bar and table top and is in charge of corralling local artists to decorate mounted bull skulls, the decorative mascot for the brand."

The Boise location opened in 2010. A restaurant in Denver's Highland neighborhood opened in 2013, and has offered over 100 different tequilas. In 2016, the Ballard restaurant closed temporarily because of an E. coli outbreak. The Denver restaurant closed permanently in 2020, during the COVID-19 pandemic.

Reception 
Seattle Metropolitan has said of the Redmond restaurant: "Decent Mex food served lunch and dinner with tequila galore. But be warned: if rollicking nighttime singles scenes are not your thing, leave before happy hour."

See also 

 List of Mexican restaurants
 List of restaurant chains in the United States

References

External links 

 
 The Matador (Nob Hill/Uptown, Portland) at Zomato
 The Matador (Redmond) at Zomato
 The Matador (West Seattle) at Zomato

Companies based in Seattle
Mexican restaurants in Portland, Oregon
Mexican restaurants in Seattle
Mexican restaurants in the United States
Mexican restaurants in Washington (state)
Mexican-American culture in Colorado
Restaurant chains in the United States
Restaurants in Denver
Mexican restaurants in Colorado